Bor is a locality situated in Värnamo Municipality, Jönköping County, Sweden with 1,256 inhabitants in 2010.

Narrow gauge railway
Bor is the terminus of the  narrow gauge Ohsabanan, a museum railway from Os, 15 km away. The railway was constructed in the summer of 1910 and runs steam trains.

Notable people

Freddy Söderberg - footballer

References 

Populated places in Jönköping County
Populated places in Värnamo Municipality
Finnveden